Wild Animals is the 13th solo studio album by Juliana Hatfield. The album is mostly acoustic and was released on September 10, 2013 It was created with the monetary contribution of Hatfield's fans through PledgeMusic with a portion of the funds raised going to the Northeast Animal Shelter in Massachusetts and to Save a Sato in Puerto Rico.

Track listing
All songs written by Juliana Hatfield

Personnel
 Juliana Hatfield – all instruments

Production
 Producer: Juliana Hatfield
 Mastering: Ian Kennedy at New Alliance East
 Design: Jay Walsh

References

2013 albums
Juliana Hatfield albums